A square inch (plural: square inches) is a unit of area, equal to the area of a square with sides of one inch.  The following symbols are used to denote square inches:
square in
sq inches, sq inch, sq in
inches/-2, inch/-2, in/-2
inches^2, inch^2, in^2
inches2, inch2, in2 (also denoted by "2)
historic engineering drawings □″ (number with a square & a double apostrophe, both as an exponent)

The square inch is a common unit of measurement in the United States and the United Kingdom. A common unit of pressure, pound per square inch (psi) is derived from this unit of area.

Equivalence with other units of area
1 square inch (assuming an international inch) is equal to: (the overbars indicate repeating decimals)
  square feet (1 square foot is equal to 144 square inches)
  square yards (1 square yard is equal to 1,296 square inches)
  square centimetres (1 square centimetre is equal to  square inches)
  square metres (1 square metre is equal to  square inches)

Units of area
Imperial units
Customary units of measurement in the United States

ja:インチ#平方インチ